University Professional and Continuing Education Association (UPCEA) is an American non-profit association for professional, continuing, and online higher education, mostly engaged in adult education. It was established in 1915 and has more than 400 member institutions, and 12,000 individuals.

About 
The association has served its members for over 100 years with conferences and specialty seminars, research and benchmarking information focusing on topics like alternative credentialing, adult (also known as non-traditional) students and the topics which are important for their success, like tracking the graduation and retention rates of non first-time full-time students. Originally started as the National University Extension Association (NUEA), UPCEA was changed to the current name in 2010. Topics which the association focuses on also includes online education, and continuing education through professional networking opportunities and publications. Based in Washington, D.C., UPCEA also builds greater awareness of the vital link between contemporary learners and public policy issues, UPCEA is known for its research and consulting on matters like marketing as well as its work in alternative credentials and digital badging. It is also part of the prestigious Washington Higher Education Secretariat which includes other members, such as the American Council on Education, who serve a significant sector in post-secondary education.

Networks 
UPCEA has several different specialized areas of practice, called networks, which provide a place for those in similar backgrounds to provide research, presentations, and awards. They include:
 Alternative Credentials Network
 Business & Operations Network
 Community and Economic Engagement Network
  Collaborative Network
 International Network
 Marketing, Enrollment, and Student Services Network
 Online Administration Network
 Program Planning and Implementation Network

Major events 
Events hosted by UPCEA include
 Annual Conference
 Summit for Online Leadership and Administration + Roundtable (SOLA+R)
 Distance Teaching & Learning (DT&L)
 MEMS: Marketing, Enrollment Management, and Student Success Conference
 Convergence: Credential Innovation in Higher Education

References

External links

Continuing education
Educational charities
Educational institutions established in 1915
1915 establishments in the United States